Michael Cordy is a British novelist. He was born in Accra, the capital of Ghana. Cordy spent much of his childhood in both West Africa and East Africa, India and Cyprus. He was educated in the United Kingdom at The King's School, Canterbury, and the universities of Leicester and Durham. After ten years in marketing and advertising, with his wife's encouragement, he became a novelist. His first novel, The Miracle Strain, took two years to complete and was published in 1997. Disney bought the film rights for $1.6 million and the novel reached no. 5 in The Sunday Times Bestseller list. An international success, it has since been published in more than twenty-five languages and over forty countries. Dan Brown published The Da Vinci Code in 2003, and its success may have influenced the renaming of Cordy's first three novels. In spite of publishing six years earlier, he has been criticised of imitating Dan Brown.

Personal life 
Michael Cordy lives in London with Jenny, his wife, and their daughter, Phoebe. Currently, he is working under contract on his first screenplay, Crime Zero, having recently sold the film rights option to a subsidiary of Warner Bros.New line Cinema.

Bibliography 
Cordy is the author of six novels:
 The Messiah Code, originally The Miracle Strain, published 1997. Doctor Tom Carter, inventor of a machine that can predict genetic defects, is contacted by a secret brotherhood to help them find the second coming of Jesus Christ to save his daughter.
 The Crime Code, originally Crime Zero, published 1999. In the near-future, a genetic project to identify the genes responsible for criminal behaviour lead into an attempt to eliminate crime by eliminating men.
 The Lucifer Code, originally Lucifer, published 2001. A religious group's attempts to witness the afterlife result in the leader declaring that the apocalypse is coming.
 The Venus Conspiracy, originally True, published 2004. A scientist's discovery of a drug that simulates love leads to a madman's attempt to turn himself into a figure of worship for the world.
 The Source, published August 2008, involves Abiogenesis. An adventure set mostly in Peru, Warner Bros. have bought an option on the film rights. A doctor's attempt to save his dying wife leads him to the discovery of a location that may be the inspiration for the Garden of Eden.
 The Colour of Death, published August 2011. The main character has an unprecedented form of synaesthesia, in which her five senses merge to form a sixth, and her hallucinations appear to be memories, but not her own.

References

External links 
 Review of Lucifer in The Observer
 Michael Cordy's Website
 United Kingdom Publisher: Penguin
 London Literary agent: Patrick Walsh

Living people
Cordy Michael
Alumni of the University of Leicester
21st-century British novelists
Year of birth missing (living people)
English male novelists
21st-century English male writers